José Quintanilla may refer to:
 José Quintanilla (footballer), Salvadoran footballer
 José Alberto Quintanilla, Bolivian swimmer

See also
 José Quintana (disambiguation)